Ibrahima Koné or Ibrahim Koné may refer to:

Ibrahima Koné (footballer, born 1969), Ivorian footballer
Ibrahima Koné (footballer, born 1977), Malian footballer
Ibrahim Koné (footballer, born 1989), Guinean (formerly Ivorian) footballer
Ibrahim Koné (footballer, born 1995), Ivorian footballer
Ibrahima Koné (footballer, born 1999), Malian footballer

See also
Brahima Bruno Koné (born 1995), Ivorian  footballer